Leviathan is American writer Paul Auster’s seventh novel, published by Viking Press in 1992. The novel follows the life and crimes of a man who decides to take action over words to deliver his message to the world, as told by his estranged best friend.

Plot introduction

The novel opens like a detective story as the narrator begins,
Six days ago, a man blew himself up by the side of a road in northern Wisconsin. There were no witnesses, but it appears that he was sitting on the grass next to his parked car when the bomb he was building accidentally went off. According to the forensic reports that have just been published, the man was killed instantly. His body burst into dozens of small pieces, and fragments of his corpse were found as far as fifty feet away from the site of the explosion. —Leviathan 

Through his own investigations, the narrator attempts to  answer questions as to who the man was who blew himself up, why he was found with a homemade bomb, and what circumstances brought him to a violent end.

Explanation of the novel's title
"Leviathan" is borrowed from the biblical sea monster that Thomas Hobbes used as a metaphor for the State in his own book of that title. As the "Phantom of Liberty", blowing up replicas of the Statue of Liberty around the country – the novel's protagonist is a Hobbesian hero  whose nemesis is the State; his self-inflicted death, a metaphor for man's doomed struggle.

Auster is known for placing his fictional characters in real-time contexts with real events as backdrop to his narratives. There are parallels with the "Unabomber," the academic urban terrorist, Theodore Kaczynski who was active for a similar length of time from the late 1970s to the mid-1990s.

Plot summary

The story is told by Peter Aaron about the victim, Benjamin Sachs, his best friend whom he first meets as a fellow writer in a Greenwich Village bar in 1975.  Peter decides to try to piece together the story of Ben's other life after agents from the F.B.I. approach him in the course of their investigation. Of their friendship, Peter acknowledges Ben's lost years of suffering and painful inner state, saying —

In 15 years, Sachs travelled from one end of himself to the other, and by the time he came to that last place, I doubt he even knew who he was anymore. So much distance had been covered by then, it wouldn't have been possible for him to remember where he had begun.

The two first meet as struggling novelists, Peter with the “wheeling” mind and the provocative Ben with his perfect marriage to the beautiful Fanny. Both have a wish to “say something”, to make a difference in the real world.

Privately, Ben himself is full of doubts and his marriage is showing cracks, when one night at a drunken party by freakish chance, he tumbles from a fourth-floor fire escape, nearly losing his life. The fall is both actual and metaphorical. For days afterward he refuses to speak and on recovery he is strangely remote. Within a week of turning 41, Ben expresses a desire to end the life he has lived until then. Feeling that his life has been a waste, he declares he wants everything to change, and serving himself with an all-or-nothing ultimatum, decides he must take control or fail. In evincing this change, he leaves Fanny, moves to a cabin in Vermont where he begins to work on a book – then vanishes.

His cabin and its contents are deserted, including his manuscript, titled Leviathan. There is no further contact with Fanny and one final meeting with Peter where he confesses all.

Peter pieces together Ben's life and relationships with Maria, an artist, and her friend Lillian. A random, violent encounter with Lillian's husband, a Vietnam War veteran named Reed sends Ben in a radically new direction.

Major themes

Austerian themes in the novel explore failure, identity, chance, coincidence and the evasive nature of truth. Maria, the character who follows strangers to photograph them is based on Sophie Calle, a French performance artist who recreated her own life by photographing actual people while creating fictions about them. Calle is acknowledged in the novel's introduction. Ben, the novel's central character meets Maria at the point where he begins to recreate his own life. The contrast is that while Calle/Maria parlayed her fictions into a career, Ben creates a life that finishes him.

Stylistically, Auster proves his themes through circuitous multi-layered writing, reporting conflicting personal accounts to inscribe subjective kinds of truth.

Characters
 Peter Aaron, novelist and narrator (titled after God's spokesman, the biblical Aaron)
 Benjamin Sachs, war protester, novelist, urban terrorist
 Fanny Sachs, Ben's wife
 Maria Turner, photographer
 Lillian Stern, ex-sex worker, Maria's best friend
 Maria Dimaggio, Lillian's little daughter
 Reed Dimaggio, Lillian's husband
 Agnes Darwin, party guest who causes Ben's accident

Literary notes

Auster references themes of coincidence and chance that began with the hero of his 1985 novel, City of Glass who believed that “nothing was real except chance”.

Adaptations 

In 2009, Audible.com produced an audio version of Leviathan, narrated by Peter Ganim, as part of its Modern Vanguard line of audiobooks.

Editions
 Leviathan, Paul Auster, Viking, New York, 1992.
Leviathan, Paul Auster, Faber and Faber, London, 1993.

See also

Paul Auster
Sophie Calle
Thomas Hobbes
Theodore Kaczynski

Footnotes

Novels by Paul Auster
American crime novels
1992 American novels
Viking Press books